SFR Medical is a provider of medical evidence reports to UK police forces. It was founded in 2018 by Dr Johann Grundlingh, an emergency medicine and intensive care consultant at Barts Health NHS Trust  and Dr Lucy Grundlingh, who worked as an emergency medicine doctor in Major Trauma Centres in London.   It  is contracted by around 50 hospitals and 12 police forces, including Surrey Police and Thames Valley Police, to streamline the medical evidence reporting process.

Police forces are supposed to pay doctors in emergency department £30 to £40 for reports, but according to Dr Grundlingh 90% of medical evidence reports sent to the police, which cannot be produced in NHS time, were not paid for and doctors have at times refused to supply more until they are compensated.  Under the existing system it takes on average 67 days for police to receive medical evidence.  The company's Streamlined Forensic Reporting process is claimed to be nearly six times faster.

The company's technology creates 3D graphical reconstructions of wounds, based on computerised tomography and magnetic resonance imaging scans of the victim, which helps NHS administrative staff when collecting medical records and can be used in court.  These images illustrate how close the wound trajectory was to a particular victim's spinal cord, vital organs or important blood vessels.  It operates under the national Forensic Capability Network.  The network's chief executive officer Jo Ashworth said: “This is an excellent case study of the public and private sectors collaborating for the benefit of victims. We became aware of several police forces wanting to access these services, and providing them through one national framework means a faster roll-out and better justice for victims.”

References 

Medical and health organisations based in London
Technology companies based in London
Medical technology companies of the United Kingdom